The San Diego Hawks (known initially as the San Diego Mariners) were a minor professional ice hockey team based in San Diego at the San Diego Sports Arena that played in the Pacific Hockey League (PHL) from 1977 to 1979. The team competed in both of the PHL's two seasons before the league folded along with its remaining teams. The team competed as the Mariners for its first season before being rebranded as the Hawks for its second season, following a change in ownership. 

The team's original name (Mariners) was adopted from a previous, unrelated hockey team, the San Diego Mariners of the World Hockey Association (WHA), who had folded earlier in 1979.

References

1977 establishments in California
1979 disestablishments in California
Defunct ice hockey teams in California
Ice hockey clubs disestablished in 1979
Ice hockey clubs established in 1977